Kadokura (written: 門倉) is a Japanese surname. Notable people with the surname include:

, Japanese shogi player
, Japanese baseball player
, Japanese composer

Japanese-language surnames